Nancy Mohamed Ali Taman (born 15 November 1994; Alexandria, Egypt) is an Egyptian artistic gymnast. Taman earned two gold medals in the 2018 Mediterranean Games and the 2019 African Games and won a silver medal in the 2015 African Games.

Gymnastics career 
Taman started her gymnastics career in 1998 at the age of four, she made her international debut at the Gymnix International competition in 2007 as a member of the Egyptian Gymnastics Federation.

In 2011, she was a member of the team that participated in the 2011 World Artistic Gymnastics Championships held in Tokyo, Japan, and was a part of the team who represented Egypt in the 2013 World Artistic Gymnastics Championships held in Antwerp, Belgium, that year, Taman ranked the fifth place in the women's vault and sixth place in the women's individual all-around final in the 2013 Mediterranean Games hosted in Mersin, Turkey.

In 2014, competed for Egypt at the 2014 Summer Youth Olympics held in Beijing, China. In 2015, participated in three competitions, the 2015 World Artistic Gymnastics Championships held in Glasgow, United Kingdom, challenge Cup gymnastics in Croatia, and the 2015 African Games
Held in Congo where she has won a silver medal.
In 2018, participated in the 2018 Osijek World Cup held in Osijek, Croatia, and won a gold medal in the 2018 Mediterranean Games in the women's vault held in Spain.

In 2019, Taman competed at the African Games where she won gold medals in the vault and team all-around events and a silver medal in the floor exercise event.

In 2021, Taman competed at the Challenge World Cup in Cairo, winning the gold medal on vault. At the 2021 World Artistic Gymnastics Championships, she became the first gymnast from the African continent to qualify to an event final. She finished fourth in the vault competition.

References 

Living people
1994 births
African Games gold medalists for Egypt
Mediterranean Games gold medalists for Egypt
African Games silver medalists for Egypt
African Games medalists in gymnastics
Egyptian female artistic gymnasts
Competitors at the 2018 Mediterranean Games
Competitors at the 2015 African Games
Competitors at the 2019 African Games
Mediterranean Games medalists in gymnastics
21st-century Egyptian women